Green Mansion or Pandespanian Mansion, is a historical building located in Bornova, İzmir. The mansion, which was used as the guesthouse of Ege University after its first restoration in 1986, was restored in 1993, 1995 and 2004 and started to be used in a way that university employees and students can spend time.

See also 
 Levantine mansions of İzmir

References 

Buildings and structures completed in 1880
Tourist attractions in İzmir
Ege University